Oncideres colombiana is a species of beetle in the family Cerambycidae. It was described by Dillon and Dillon in 1946. It is known from Venezuela, Panama and Colombia.

References

colombiana
Beetles described in 1946